Zeer Mountain is located in Kukherd Rural District, Kukherd District, Bastak County, Hormozgan Province in the south of Iran.

See also 
Dasak Mountain
Khe Aab Mountain
Nakh Mountain
The Historic Bath of Siba

References 

Peter Jackson and Lawrence Lockhart (Ed) (1986), Vol. 6th,  The Cambridge History of Iran: Cambridge University Press
الكوخردى ، محمد ، بن يوسف، (كُوخِرد حَاضِرَة اِسلامِيةَ عَلي ضِفافِ نَهر مِهران) الطبعة الثالثة ،دبى: سنة 199۷ للميلاد Mohammed Kookherdi (1997) Kookherd, an Islamic civil at Mehran river,  third edition: Dubai
محمدیان، کوخری، محمد ، “ (به یاد کوخرد) “، ج1. ج2. چاپ اول، دبی: سال انتشار 2003 میلادی Mohammed Kookherdi Mohammadyan (2003), Beyade Kookherd, third edition : Dubai.
محمدیان، کوخردی ، محمد ،  «شهرستان بستک و بخش کوخرد»  ، ج۱. چاپ اول، دبی: سال انتشار ۲۰۰۵ میلادی Mohammed Kookherdi Mohammadyan (2005), Shahrestan  Bastak & Bakhshe Kookherd, First edition : Dubai.
عباسی ، قلی، مصطفی،  «بستک وجهانگیریه»، چاپ اول، تهران : ناشر: شرکت انتشارات جهان
سلامى، بستكى، احمد.  (بستک در گذرگاه تاریخ)  ج2 چاپ اول، 1372 خورشيدى
اطلس گیتاشناسی استان‌های ایران [Atlas Gitashenasi Ostanhai Iran] (Gitashenasi Province Atlas of Iran)
محمدیان، کوخری، محمد. (کوخرد سرزمین شاعران)  ج1. چاپ اول، دبی: سال انتشار 200۵ میلادی Mohammed Kookherdi Mohammadyan (2005), Sarzamin Shaaran, First edition : Dubai.

External links 
  Kookherd website

Kukherd District
Bastak County
Mountains of Hormozgan Province
Mountains of Iran